Walhart may refer to:

 Walhart, a character in the video game  Fire Emblem Awakening; the current founder of Empire of Valm and the Conqueror and the major enemy boss
 Charles Walhart Woodman, the U.S. representative from Illinois from the 1800s